Minuartia glabra, commonly called Appalachian stichwort, is a species of flowering plant in the carnation family (Caryophyllaceae). It is native to the eastern United States, where it has a scattered distribution.

Its natural habitat is areas of siliceous rock outcrops, which include granite, sandstone, gneiss, and schist. In the Cumberland Mountains, this species is a major component of sandstone glade communities. Due to its narrow habitat requirements, this species is uncommon throughout its range.

Minuartia glabra is a small, delicate annual. It produces white flowers in late spring and early summer. It is similar to Minuartia groenlandica, which it was historically considered a variety of. It can be distinguished from M. groenlandica by its taller stature, annual habit, upright and not mat-forming growth, smaller petals, and flowers in greater number per cyme. In addition, M. glabra is found in lower elevations than M. groenlandica.

References

glabra